The iris lorikeet (Saudareos iris) is a small, up to 20 cm long, green lorikeet bird. The male has a red forehead, yellow nape, purple band back from eye between nape and cheek, and yellowish below. The female almost similar with red-marked green forecrown and yellowish green cheek.

The iris lorikeet is distributed in the forests and woodlands on the islands of Wetar and Timor in the Lesser Sundas. It is found from sea level to altitude of 1,500m. The iris lorikeet is usually found in small flocks.

Due to ongoing habitat loss, limited range and illegal trapping for the caged-bird trade, the iris lorikeet is evaluated as Near Threatened on IUCN Red List of Threatened Species. It is listed on Appendix II of CITES.

Taxonomy
The iris lorikeet was formerly placed in the genus Psitteuteles but was moved to a newly introduced genus Saudareos based on the results of a molecular genetic analysis of the lorikeets published in 2020.
There are two or three poorly differentiated subspecies:
S. i iris (West Timor) -
S. i. wetterensis (Wetar) –  larger area of darker green on side of head.
S. i. rubripileum (East Timor) – hindcrown also red, violet-blue band on hindneck.

Description
It is mostly green with pale-green transverse striations on its underside. The head is red above the eye and there is a purple band from the eyes extending over the ears. The beak is red-orange, the iris is orange, and the legs are bluish-grey. The male and female are almost identical, but the red on the head of the female is paler and less extensive. Juveniles resemble females, but have a brownish bill, brown irises, duller purple bands and less red on the head. The extent and shade of the red and purple on the head varies between two or three subspecies.

References

Cited texts

External links 

 BirdLife Species Factsheet
 Oriental Bird Images: Iris Lorikeet  Selected photos

iris lorikeet
Birds of Timor
Birds of Wetar
Near threatened animals
Near threatened biota of Asia
iris lorikeet
Taxobox binomials not recognized by IUCN